Three Girls in Paris is a 1963 Danish family film directed by Gabriel Axel and starring Daniel Gélin.

Plot 
Three Danish girls (Ghita Nørby, Susse Wold and Hanne Borchsenius) travel to Paris. After leaving their luggage and money at a hotel, they tour the city, but forget what the hotel is called and where it is located. They are helped by a Parisian taxi driver, and meet a series of typical French people.

Cast 
 Daniel Gélin as Raymond
 Ghita Nørby as Hanne
 Susse Wold as Lotte
 Hanne Borchsenius as Dorte
 Dirch Passer as Kok Harald Mikkelsen
 Paul Hagen as Frederik
 Erling Schroeder as Mand på dansk konsulat i Paris
 Gabriel Axel as Fransklærer
 Jacques Mauclair as Overbetjenten
 Noël Roquevert as Mr. Maurice
 Jackie Sardou
 Serge Sauvion
 Dominique Davray
 Colette Régis

References

External links 
 
 
 

1963 films
Danish children's films
1960s Danish-language films
Films directed by Gabriel Axel
Films set in Paris